Pembroke Pettit (June 13, 1852 – April 7, 1928) was an American lawyer and politician who served in the Virginia General Assembly, first in the Virginia Senate and later in the Virginia House of Delegates.

References

External links 

1852 births
1928 deaths
Democratic Party members of the Virginia House of Delegates
19th-century American politicians
20th-century American politicians